WASP-49 is a yellow dwarf main-sequence star. Its surface temperature is 5600 K. WASP-49 is depleted of heavy elements relative to Sun, with metallicity Fe/H index of -0.23, meaning it has an abundance of iron 59% of the Sun's level.

Planetary system
In 2011, one planet, named WASP-49b was discovered. In 2017, it was found to have an extensive sodium envelope.A study in 2019 using data from the Hubble Space Telescope in near-UV found clear absorption features caused by metals, including magnesium and iron. The magnesium and iron gas is not gravitationally bound to the planet, but could be magnetically confined to the planet. The sodium envelope around WASP-49b could be due to an Io-like exomoon. This new idea was called interesting, but also speculative.

References

Lepus (constellation)
Planetary transit variables
G-type main-sequence stars
Planetary systems with one confirmed planet
J06042146-1657550